Christian Kezel (born 6 June 1950) is a French sports shooter. He competed at the 1988 Summer Olympics and the 1992 Summer Olympics.

References

External links
 

1950 births
Living people
French male sport shooters
Olympic shooters of France
Shooters at the 1988 Summer Olympics
Shooters at the 1992 Summer Olympics
People from Villeurbanne
Sportspeople from Lyon Metropolis
20th-century French people